Common names: Coronado Island rattlesnake.

Crotalus oreganus caliginis is a venomous pit viper subspecies endemic to South Coronado Island, Mexico.

Description

Geographic range
Known only from the type locality, given as "South Coronado Island, off the northwest coast of Baja California, Mexico."

Conservation status
This species is classified as least concern  on the IUCN Red List of Threatened Species (v3.1, 2001). Species are listed as such due to their wide distribution, presumed large population, or because it is unlikely to be declining fast enough to qualify for listing in a more threatened category. The population trend was stable when assessed in 2007.

References

External links

 

oreganus caliginis